The 2021 Andalucía Open (also known as the 2021 AnyTech365 Andalucía Open for sponsorship reasons) was a tournament on the 2021 ATP Tour. It was played on outdoor clay courts in Marbella, Spain. It was organised with a single-year licence in 2021, and was held at Club de Tennis Puente Romano from April 5 to 11, 2021.
This was the 4th edition of the Challenger 80 tournament held in Puente Romano in Marbella. It was also the first edition of ATP 250. So this year professional tennis was played for the first time for two weeks. 
AnyTech365 Andalucía Open becomes the fourth ATP Tour tournament in Spain, alongside competitions in Madrid, Barcelona and Mallorca.

Champions

Singles

  Pablo Carreño Busta def.  Jaume Munar, 6–1, 2–6, 6–4

Doubles

  Ariel Behar /  Gonzalo Escobar def.  Tomislav Brkić /  Nikola Ćaćić, 6–2, 6–4

Points and prize money

Point distribution

Prize money 

*per team

Singles main-draw entrants

Seeds

1 Rankings are as of March 29, 2021

Other entrants
The following players received wildcards into the main draw:
  Carlos Alcaraz
  Fabio Fognini
  Holger Rune

The following players received entry from the qualifying draw:
  Henri Laaksonen
  Nikola Milojević
  Mario Vilella Martínez
  Bernabé Zapata Miralles

Withdrawals 
Before the tournament
  Pablo Andújar → replaced by  Mikhail Kukushkin
  Roberto Bautista Agut → replaced by  Facundo Bagnis
  Richard Gasquet → replaced by  Francisco Cerúndolo
  Lloyd Harris → replaced by  Norbert Gombos
  Dušan Lajović → replaced by  Taro Daniel
  Cameron Norrie → replaced by  Roberto Carballés Baena
  Alexei Popyrin → replaced by  Ilya Ivashka
  Andrey Rublev → replaced by  Damir Džumhur
  Stan Wawrinka → replaced by  Pedro Martínez

Doubles main-draw entrants

Seeds

 Rankings are as of March 22, 2021.

Other entrants
The following pairs received wildcards into the doubles main draw:
  Feliciano López /  Marc López
  David Marrero /  Adrián Menéndez Maceiras

Withdrawals
Before the tournament
  Marcelo Demoliner /  Santiago González → replaced by  Santiago González /  Miguel Ángel Reyes-Varela
  Cameron Norrie /  Matt Reid → replaced by  Ričardas Berankis /  Artem Sitak

References

External links
 

2021 ATP Tour
Tennis tournaments in Spain
April 2021 sports events in Spain
2021 in Spanish tennis
Andalucia Tennis Experience